Kandava Station is a railway station on the Ventspils I – Tukums II Railway.

References 

Railway stations in Latvia